Chełmnian–Kociewian–Warmian dialect is a group of dialects of Polish language used in the Kuyavian-Pomeranian, Pomeranian, and Warmian-Masurian Voivodeships. It is considered by some linguists as the branch of Greater Poland dialect, while also, as the separate dialect, by others.

Citations

Notes

References 

Polish dialects